San Quirico Martire is the Roman Catholic church in the frazione of Bolano in the comune of Fisciano, province of Salerno, region of Campania, Italy.

History
Originally this was a chapel dedicated to Santa Maria del Carmine associated with the Congrega della Carità of Fisciano. It replaced in 1890 an earlier ancient church of San Quirico, outside of town, in a lowlying area, which due to repeated flooding had caused the structure to fall into ruin. The Belltower was built in 1897. A number of the ornaments date from this year including the canvas depicting the S.S Vergine di Pompei, the Madonna of the Carmine, and the altar of the Addolorata. 

Originally a rural location, it is now in an urban neighborhood.

References

19th-century Roman Catholic church buildings in Italy
Roman Catholic churches completed in 1897
Churches in the province of Salerno